Inteqam (Urdu: انتقام, lit. 'To Take Revenge') is a 2022 Pakistani television series, directed by Zahid Mehmood and written by Saira Arif. It is produced by Abdullah Kadwani and Asad Qureshi under their banner 7th Sky Entertainment. It premiered on 10 January 2022 on Geo TV. It stars Aruba Mirza and Humayoun Ashraf.

Plot 
Uroosa's siblings conflict with their maternal relatives to settle an inheritance. Burdened with unemployment and dowry demand, Shahzad and Saima file for their mother's right over their grandparents' wealth. The legal proceedings put Uroosa's love life through a difficult test as her cousin and childhood love, Waleed, is no longer welcomed in her house despite his efforts to help them. When Waleed's father weakens Abida's stance with stronger evidence against property distribution, the conflict gets much worse. This puts his family in haste to send him abroad and distance him from Uroosa.

Cast 
 Aruba Mirza as Uroosa
 Humayoun Ashraf as Waleed
 Haris Waheed as Shahzad; Seema and Uroosa's brother
 Asim Mehmood as Bilal; Mohsin's brother, Saima's brother-in-law. Zoya's husband.
 Ellie Zaid as Beenish aka Beeni; Waleed's sister
 Adla Khan as Seema; Shahzad and Uroosa's sister. Mohsins wife.
 Sumaiyya Bukhsh as Zoya; Bilal's wife and Uroosa's friend
 Shabbir Jan as Zaheer; Waleed and Benni's father
 Yasir Shoro as Raheel; Beenish's husband. Had an affair with another girl.
 Noor ul Hassan as Saleem; Shahzad, Saima and Uroosa's father
 Zainab Qayyum as Saba; Waleed and Benni's mother
 Sadaf Aashan as Abida; Shahzad, Saima and Uroosa's mother
 Mizna Waqas as Neelo; Mohsin and Bilal's sister
 Shaheen Khan as Shimmi; Neelo, Mohsin and Bilal's mother
 Naveed Raza as Mohsin; Seema's husband. 
 Farah Nadeem as Sonia; Zoya's Mother
 Hashim Butt as Ashfaq; Zoya's Father
 Taqi Ahmed as Behram; Waleed's friend
 Birjees Farooqui as Tehmina; Behram's mother
 Maria Gul as Sheena; Beenish's friend
 Areej Chaudhary as Bubbly; Beenish's friend. Raheels girlfriend.
 Uzair Abbasi as Rasheed Baba; Servant at Waleed's home
 Akbar Islam as Idress; Neelo's fiancé (Guest Appearance)
 Omi butt as Usman; Waleed's friend (Guest Appearance)
 Ahmed Bashir

Soundtrack 
The official original soundtrack of Inteqam features Qamar Nashad's poetry, Naveed Nashad's music composition and vocals of Nabeel Shaukat Ali and Fiza Javed.

References

External links 
Official website
 

2022 Pakistani television series debuts
2022 Pakistani television series endings
Urdu-language television shows
Pakistani drama television series
Geo TV original programming